The El Capitan Lodge is a Rustic-style lodge built in 1935 on Lake Como in the Bitterroot National Forest in Ravalli County, Montana.  It was listed on the National Register of Historic Places in 1990.

It was "designed by N.J. Kramis and other charter members of the Hamilton Hikers' Club."

References

National Register of Historic Places in Ravalli County, Montana
Buildings and structures completed in 1935
Bitterroot National Forest
1935 establishments in Montana
Rustic architecture in Montana
Clubhouses on the National Register of Historic Places in Montana